Reasoners Run is a stream in the U.S. state of Ohio. It is a tributary of Olive Green Creek in Morgan County.

Reasoners Run was named for a man named Reasoner who often visited the stream in order to hunt.

See also
List of rivers of Ohio

References

Rivers of Morgan County, Ohio
Rivers of Noble County, Ohio
Rivers of Ohio